Stelligeridae is a family of sponges belonging to the order Axinellida.

Genera:
 Halicnemia Bowerbank, 1864
 Higginsia Higgin, 1877
 Paratimea Hallmann, 1917
 Plenaster Lim & Wiklund, 2017
 Stelligera Gray, 1867

References

Sponge families